Drew McDonald (born Charles Shaw, name changed via deed poll; 16 June 1955 – 9 February 2015) was a Scottish professional wrestler. He was best known for wrestling in the United Kingdom since the 1980s.

Professional wrestling career
McDonald, born Charles Shaw, first got into wrestling when friend of his who ran a school in Perth for wayward children was promoting a wrestling show to make funds for the school. Ian Law who held a splinter claim to the British Middleweight Championship at the time (the main lineage being held by Brian "Goldbelt" Maxine) was helping his friend  run the show. One of the wrestlers had been seriously injured two weeks out from the show and a friend asked McDonald if he would stand in for the injured man. McDonald had a two-week crash course before first pro match against Wild Angus, The match lasted 5 rounds with Angus beating McDonald by the final bell. 

McDonald stayed in Scotland wrestling for another year after that first match, in April 1984 he went down to England to work for Joint Promotions, the biggest promoters at that time (in the United Kingdom). The next five years saw McDonald wrestle against the likes of Ray Steele and Gill Singh and become a frequent face on ITV's televised wrestling coverage. Outside of the ring, McDonald would also develop friendships with the likes of Danny Boy Collins, Fit Finlay and referee Jeff Kaye. McDonald at one point would join the army at the Guards Depot at Pirbright where he joined with the Scots Guards. During his time there he met Dave Taylor, later of WCW fame, who had enlisted in the same regiment as McDonald, as a bandsman on the same day. 

A match screened as part of ITV's 1984 FA Cup Final coverage saw McDonald team with Big Daddy to defeat Giant Haystacks and Finlay. Three years later, he adopted the persona of the masked Spoiler, managed by the German Doctor Monika Kaiser, played by his lifelong partner, Monika Markwart. Teaming with King Kendo to face Daddy and Andy Blair, he was unmasked by Daddy but preserved his identity due to a black nylon stocking worn over his head and under the mask, concealing his identity so he could get away. A subsequent match pitting the Spoiler and Rasputin (Shawn Doyle) against Daddy and Jason "Kashmir" Singh saw the Spoiler again unmasked and this time identified clearly as McDonald. A rematch between the four with a "Hair vs Hair" stipulation ended in the defeated McDonald being shaved bald.  He would retain this look for all his remaining matches on ITV.

After the demise of ITV's wrestling coverage, McDonald moved to All Star Wrestling. For some time, he continued to be managed by Kaiser in All Star. In the early 1990s, he adopted the image of "The Ultimate Chippendale", later forming a tag team of 'Chippendales' with Dale "The Model" Preston. Aside from wrestling for all the top promotions in the UK, McDonald traveled worldwide, wrestling for promotions like Canada's Stampede Wrestling under the name Ben Doon McDonald, and feuding with stars like Chris Benoit.

McDonald won many UK top titles including Scottish Championship Wrestling's Scottish Heavyweight Championship, and All Star Wrestling's British Heavyweight Championship. He won the British title when he defeated Robbie Brookside in Croydon on 7 July 2005.
McDonald teamed up with many long time wrestlers, including Dave Finlay (in the Catch Wrestling Association), Ulf Herman, and Robbie Brookside. Later McDonald would team with rookie stars like Thunder, and Raj Gosh. During a time when both Thunder and Gosh wrestled in Frontier Wrestling Alliance at the same time as McDonald the group banded together under the stable name "The Triad". 

In January 2006, Steve Sonic defeated McDonald in a ladder match for All Star Wrestling's British Heavyweight Championship. Throughout 2006 McDonald would continue to wrestle in All Star as well as with other British independent promotions.  McDonald also ran his own wrestling school along with former wrestler and referee Jeff Kaye in Stanningley, Leeds. In 2008, he began working for Superstars of Wrestling.

His last match took place at GL1 Gloucester Leisure Centre in 2013

Drew worked for an independent crowd management company called The SES Group - Show and Event as a security manager

Death
McDonald died at the age of 59 on 9 February 2015 from cancer.  He is survived by his partner Monika Markwart aka his manager Doctor Monika Kaiser. WWE Wrestler Paige paid tribute to him on that night's episode of Monday Night Raw with the words "RIP Drew McDonald" written on her arms.

Championships and accomplishments
All Star Wrestling
ASW British Heavyweight Championship (1 time)
European Wrestling Promotion
Iron Man Tournament (2005)
Frontier Wrestling Alliance
FWA Tag Team Championship (1 time) - with Ulf Herman
Scottish Championship Wrestling
SCW Scottish Heavyweight Championship (1 time)
The Wrestling Alliance
TWA British Heavyweight Championship (1 time)

Luchas de Apuestas record

References

1955 births
2015 deaths
Sportspeople from Perth, Scotland
Scottish male professional wrestlers
Place of death missing
Stampede Wrestling alumni